James M. Ellis was an American lawyer and politician who served in the West Virginia House of Delegates during the Reconstruction era. He lived in Oak Hill. T. L. Sweeney and J. H. Love were reported to be the only other "Colored" attorneys in Fayette County, West Virginia in the 1920s. He served three terms in the House of Delegates. He and the other African American legislators who served at the time were Republicans.

See also
Christopher H. Payne

References

Year of birth missing
Year of death missing
Republican Party members of the West Virginia House of Delegates
People from Oak Hill, West Virginia
African-American state legislators in West Virginia
West Virginia lawyers
African-American politicians during the Reconstruction Era
19th-century American lawyers
African-American lawyers
20th-century American lawyers
African-American men in politics